The 176th Pennsylvania House of Representatives District is located in Monroe County, Pennsylvania and includes the following areas:

Chestnuthill Township
Eldred Township
Hamilton Township
Jackson Township
Polk Township
Ross Township
Tobyhanna Township
Tunkhannock Township

Representatives

References

Government of Monroe County, Pennsylvania
176